Nusantara Air Charter was an Indonesian airline which operated charter flights. It was established in 2003.

Fleet

Former fleet
The Nusantara Air Charter fleet consisted of the following aircraft (as of October 2019):

See also
TransNusa

References

Defunct airlines of Indonesia
Companies based in Jakarta
Charter airlines
Airlines established in 2003
Airlines disestablished in 2020
Airlines formerly banned in the European Union
Indonesian companies established in 2003
2003 establishments in Indonesia
2020 disestablishments in Indonesia